The iDog was a robot dog toy designed and manufactured by Sega Toys. An iDog figure receives input from an external music source, such as an MP3 player, and will light up and "dance" to the music's rhythm. It is marketed as the eDog in Germany, Italy and the Netherlands.

Basic iDog
The iDog reacts to music from an external source, such as an external speaker or through a direct connection to a music source such as an MP3 player. It features seven flashing LED lights on its face and has the ability to 'dance' to the beat of the music by intermittently wiggling its ears and shaking its head. It also has a number of switches on its nose, head and tail which allow it to react to user input. It has various emotions (which change based on user interaction) that provide different color patterns on its LED lights.

The iDog began shipping worldwide between March and April 2005. The iDog comes in several colors including white, black, pink, red, lime green, blue, a tiger print, and a dalmatian print. Decorative clothing for the iDog has been released, including feet-warmers, ear-warmers and scarves.

Variations

In 2005, Sega partnered with Atmos Tokyo to produce sports-themed iDogs as part of a new line, titled "iDog x Atmos". In 2007, Tiger Electronics released the iDog Amp'd, an upgraded version of the iDog with stereo speakers that nod its head and tap its foot in time with the music being played.  The iDog Pup, a puppy version of the iDog with poseable ears and a moving head, was released in 2007 and was a localized version of the iDog Mini released in Japan in 2005. Also in 2007, two variants called "SpiDogs" were released to promote the film Spider-Man 3. They resemble the standard Spider-Man costume and the Black Suit respectively. In 2008, three new versions of the iDog were released. The iDog Clip is a fully functional mini-sized iDog which can be clipped onto a backpack, the iDog Dance is a larger version of the iDog that stands up and dances in time to the music, it also features 7 touch sensors (like the iCat), and the iDog Soft Speaker, a plush version of the iDog Amp'd that remixes some songs on it and has a pocket where the battery compartment is so you can store things in it. In 2009, as one of the last iDogs released, Hasbro released the iDog Plush Puppy. This smaller plush iDog came in pink and purple and was one of the first iDogs that didn't need batteries. It came with a cord attached to it, like the iDog Clip. But it had the light patterns stitched onto it.

As part of a promotion with McDonald's in Japan, sets of iDog-based toys were included in Happy Meals in 2007. In 2007 and 2008, Burger King had a promotion which included miniature models with stickers representing the dots.

Personalities

Different kinds of music cause iDog to develop different personalities, as displayed through the color of LED lights that flash and blink on its face.

iCat

The iCat is a feline version of the iDog. Similar to the iDog, it reacts to music from an external source, such as an MP3 player. It features seven flashing LED lights on its face and has the ability to "dance" to the beat of the music. It also has switches on its tail, head (nose), and 7 touch sensors which allow it to react to user input.  Like the iDog, its LED light color patterns display various "emotions" based on user interaction and the music played.

iFish

A piscine version of the iDog, the iFish plays music and moves in a swimming-like motion. The iFish also has an internal selection of music. The iFish comes with a blue or orange tail fin, with a 3.5 mm audio cable for audio input. Like the iDog, it is touch-sensitive.

iCy

The iCy, marketed as the iPenguin in select countries, is a penguin version of the iDog.  In addition to playing music, it dances and the LED lights on its stomach flash in time to the music. Unlike its predecessors, it has only two touch sensors for user interaction: its tail, which is designed to annoy it rather than reward it, and its beak, which is used to pet it. It has various "emotions" which change based on user interaction and music played.

iTurtle

The iTurtle is a turtle version of the iDog. It also comes with a plug cable (3.5 mm) with 2 touch sensors on its tail and head. It moves its shell up and down, shakes its head side to side, and taps its foot. Has the same things as others except his moods are modified.

Viral marketing
In 2006, UK musician Jesta was inspired to write a song focusing on the product, titled "Me, My Music & My iDog." That same year, as part of the Daily Source Code podcast, host Adam Curry spoke about the iDog.

See also
 Aibo
 Poo-Chi

References 

Sega
Hasbro products
2005 robots
2000s toys
Robotic dogs
Entertainment robots
Robots of the United States
Toy animals